Alex Watkins (born July 17, 1989) is a former American football defensive lineman. He was a member of the Calgary Stampeders, Tennessee Titans and played college football at Alabama.

Early years
Watkins played high school football at Haywood High School in Brownsville, Tennessee. He committed to play for Alabama as part of Nick Saban's first recruiting class as head coach of the Crimson Tide in January 2007.

College career
At Alabama, Watkins redshirted the 2007 season and did not see any playing time for the 2008 season during his redshirt freshman year. During the 2009 season, Watkins appeared in three games as part of the squad that won the 2009 Bowl Championship Series championship. Over his final two seasons with the Crimson Tide, Watkins played primarily as a reserve and on special teams in both the 2010 and 2011 seasons. During the 2011 campaign, Watkins broke his arm in their game against Tennessee. He returned to the field in their next game after their bye week and played against LSU with 23 staples and a plate in his left forearm.

College statistics

Professional career
In the days that followed the 2012 NFL Draft, Watkins signed with the Tennessee Titans as an undrafted free agent in April 2012. Watkins remained with the Titans through much of training camp before he was waived on August 10, 2012, after he sustained an ankle injury during practice. On March 11, 2013, Watkins was signed by the CFL's Calgary Stampeders.  Watkins as later released by the Stampeders.

References 

1989 births
Living people
Alabama Crimson Tide football players
American football defensive linemen
Calgary Stampeders players
People from Brownsville, Tennessee
Players of American football from Tennessee
Tennessee Titans players
People from Temple, Texas
Florida Gators football coaches